Odessky District is an administrative and municipal district (raion), one of the thirty-two in Omsk Oblast, Russia. It is located in the south of the oblast. Its administrative center is the rural locality (a selo) of Odesskoye. Population: 17,422 (2010 Census);  The population of Odesskoye accounts for 35.3% of the district's total population.

Notable residents 

Gennady Komnatov (1949–1979), Soviet Olympic cyclist, born in Zhelannoye

References

Notes

Sources

Districts of Omsk Oblast